Cuddles the Orangutan was one half of Keith Harris's puppet act, the sidekick and nemesis of Orville the Duck. The ape was orange, with a blue face.  He wore a white shirt collar and blue tie, and his catchphrase was "I hate that duck." In the TV show actress Ruth Verrall played the part of Cuddles when movement was needed.

External links 

Harris' accolades with Orville and Cuddles, and new show

Television characters introduced in 1982
Ventriloquists' dummies
Fictional apes
British comedy puppets